Patrick Stewart (born 1940) is an English film, television and stage actor.

Patrick Stewart may also refer to:

Patrick Stewart, 2nd Earl of Orkney (c. 1566–1615), executed for treason
Patrick Stewart burial controversy (1970–2005), American soldier and practicing Wiccan whose religion caused a controversy after his death
Patrick Maxwell Stewart  (1795–1846), London merchant and Whig MP
Patrick Shaw-Stewart (1888–1917), scholar and poet remembered for his poem Achilles in the Trench

See also
Patrick Stuart (disambiguation)